Tony Cheung is an international Hong Kong lawn bowler.

Bowls career

World Championships
In 2020 he was selected for the 2020 World Outdoor Bowls Championship in Australia.

World Singles Champion of Champions
Cheung finished runner-up in the 2018 World Singles Champion of Champions losing to Shannon McIlroy in the final  and the following year he reached the final again but lost to Lee Schraner.

Asia Pacific
Cheung won a fours bronze medal in the 2015 Asia Pacific Bowls Championships and a singles bronze four years later at the 2019 Asia Pacific Bowls Championships in the Gold Coast, Queensland.

Personal life
He is an engineer by trade.

References

Hong Kong male bowls players
Living people
Year of birth missing (living people)